Cakalele dance (pronounced "cha-ka-leh-leh", spelled tjakalele by the Dutch) is a war dance from North and Central Maluku in Indonesia. Hybrid versions also exist among the natives of Sulawesi, Timor, and the Tanimbar Islands. The dance is performed by men, two of whom represent opposing captains or leaders while the others are the warriors supporting them. After an opening ritual, the captains engage in a mock-duel with a spear (sanokat) and long knife (lopu) while their supporters use a long knife in the right hand and a narrow wooden shield in the left hand. The shield  is referred to as a salawaku, or by a local name such as the Tobelo o dadatoko. The cakalele originated as a way for the warriors to celebrate after a successful raid. Dancers dress in full warrior costume and are backed by the rhythm of the drum and gong (tifa) and fife (sulin).

Gallery

See also

 Kabasaran
 Arnis

Notes

External links
 Museum Maluku

War dances
Maluku (province)
Dances of Indonesia
Theatre in Indonesia
Traditional drama and theatre of Indonesia